Kim Eung-soo (born February 12, 1961) is a South Korean actor. Kim lived in Japan for seven years, where he studied filmmaking at the Japan Institute of the Moving Image.

Filmography

Film

Television series

Variety show

Web shows

Music video appearances

Theater

Ambassadorship 
 Honorary Military of Muju (2022)

Awards and nominations

References

External links 
 
 
 
 

1961 births
Living people
South Korean male film actors
South Korean male television actors
South Korean male musical theatre actors
South Korean male stage actors
South Korean male web series actors
Seoul Institute of the Arts alumni
People from South Chungcheong Province
20th-century South Korean male actors
21st-century South Korean male actors
Gwangsan Kim clan